, , ,  or , Cyrillic: ,  or , is a local government unit, most commonly translated as municipality in English. It is used by the following countries:

Notes and references
Notes:

References:

Types of administrative division